Linda Fruhvirtová defeated Magda Linette in the final, 4–6, 6–3, 6–4 to win the singles tennis title at the 2022 WTA Indian Open. It was her maiden WTA Tour singles title.

Serena Williams was the champion from when the event was last held in 2008 in Bangalore, but she retired from professional tennis at the 2022 US Open.

Seeds

Draw

Finals

Top half

Bottom half

Qualifying

Seeds

Qualifiers

Qualifying draw

First qualifier

Second qualifier

Third qualifier

Fourth qualifier

Fifth qualifier

Sixth qualifier

References

External links
 Main draw
 Qualifying draw

Chennai Open - Singles